The Box Set can refer to:

 The Box Set (Kiss)
 The Box Set (Cocteau Twins)
 The Box Set (The Twelfth Man album), 2009
 The Box Set (Jimmy Lyons album) (2003)